Ostrovul Mare is a natural reserve, an island on the Danube together with Ostrovul Calnovăț, in the proximity of Islaz, Teleorman County. On the island is breeding a colony of pygmy cormorant.

References

Geography of Teleorman County
Islands of the Danube
River islands of Romania